The following lists events that happened during 2000 in Republic of Albania.

Incumbents 
 President: Rexhep Meidani
 Prime Minister: Ilir Meta

Events

July 
 July 7  - In a cabinet reshuffle, Ilir Gjoni replaces Luan Hajdaraga as defense minister.

Deaths 
 28 May - Ihsan Toptani, Albanian activist and journalist.
 19 October - Mahir Domi, Albanian linguist and academic (B.1915)

References 

 
Years of the 20th century in Albania
2000s in Albania